was a Japanese samurai of the Edo period.

Career
Mizuno was an official in the Tokugawa shogunate.  He was a junior counselor (wakadoshiyori) in the 1770s.   From 3 November 1871 to 3 May 1788, he was a senior counselor (rōjū) at the top of the shōguns hierarchy.

In the political struggles of his time, he was a member of the faction headed by Tanuma Okitsugu.  He managed to survive Tanuma's downfall; and he worked for a time with Matsudaira Sadanobu.

References

Samurai
Rōjū
1731 births
1802 deaths